Pierre de Latil (1903–?) was a French science journalist known for his popular science works, but also as an author of youth literature. He died in 2001.

In 1953 he authored of one of the first introductory works on cybernetics. He co-authored several essays with Jacques Bergier

He was a scientific columnist at Le Figaro and president of the AJSPI (Association des journalistes scientifiques de la presse d’information -  the Association of Science Journalists of the News Press) in 1968.

Works

Original:

References

Science journalists
1903 births
Date of death missing
French journalists
Cyberneticists